The 25th Army Corps was an Army corps in the Imperial Russian Army.

Composition

3rd Grenadier Division
46th Infantry Division

Part of
5th Army: 1914
9th Army: 1914 - 1915
4th Army: 1915
3rd Army: 1915 - 1916
4th Army: 1916
2nd Army: 1916
Russian Special Army: 1916 - 1917
11th Army: 1917

Commanders
1910-1914: Dmitry Zuyev
1914-1915: Alexander Ragoza
1915-1916: Yuri Danilov
1916-1917: Lavr Kornilov

References 
 

Corps of the Russian Empire